British Cycling has competed at the UCI Track Cycling World Championships frequently.

2015 

Great Britain competed at the 2015 UCI Track Cycling World Championships in Saint-Quentin-en-Yvelines at the Vélodrome de Saint-Quentin-en-Yvelines from 18–22 February 2015. A team of 20 cyclists (8 women, 12 men) was announced to represent the country in the event.

Results

Men

Sources

Women

Sources

Great Britain competed as the host nation at the 2016 UCI Track Cycling World Championships at the Lee Valley VeloPark in London from 2–4 March 2016. A team of 21 cyclists (9 women, 12 men) was announced to represent the country in the event.

Riders
Katie Archibald, the 21-year-old reigning European champion, was named in the British squad but will miss the championships due to tearing a posterior cruciate ligament in December.

Men
Ages as of 2 March 2016

Women
Ages as of 2 March 2016

Results

Men

Sources

Women

Sources

References

Great Britain at cycling events